Fabio Triboli (born 16 May 1966) is an Italian male paralympic athlete who won medals at the Paralympic Games.

References

External links
 

1966 births
Living people
Paralympic cyclists of Italy
Paralympic gold medalists for Italy
Paralympic silver medalists for Italy
Paralympic bronze medalists for Italy
Paralympic athletes of Fiamme Azzurre
Medalists at the 2004 Summer Paralympics
Medalists at the 2008 Summer Paralympics
Paralympic medalists in cycling
Cyclists at the 2004 Summer Paralympics
Cyclists at the 2008 Summer Paralympics